Kevin Grant (born 25 July 1952) is a Canadian former international soccer player who played for the Canada men's national soccer team between 1971 and 1976, and is currently the U17 head coach for Hamilton United Elite girls program.

Playing career 
Grant was born in London, England, and moved to Burlington, Ontario at the age of 15. He played club soccer with East Hamilton Cougars, East Hamilton Legion, and Hamilton Croatia. Despite being an international in the 1970s he did not play as a professional in the North American Soccer League. In 1978, he played in the National Soccer League with Hamilton Italo-Canadians. He signed with Buffalo Blazers for the 1980 season.

In 1981, he played with the Hamilton Steelers, and won the NSL Championship. In 1983, he played with the Toronto Nationals of the Canadian Professional Soccer League. 

On 8 May 2014, he was inducted into the Hamilton Soccer Hall of Fame as a player.

International career 
Grant played with the Canada U-23 team, and made his debut on 24 August 1971 against Mexico, and played two matches in the 1976 Summer Olympics. He also participated in the 1975 Pan American Games, and featured in three matches. He made his senior team debut on 24 August 1972 against Mexico in a FIFA World Cup qualifier match and later featured in eight additional matches.

Managerial career 
Grant coached in the National Soccer League with Hamiilton Steelers in 1982, and secured the NSL Championship after defeating Toronto Italia. In 1983, he succeed Frank Pike along with Colin Franks as the head coaches for Toronto Nationals in the Canadian Professional Soccer League. In 1986, he returned to manage the Hamilton Steelers where he secured the inaugural Canadian Soccer League championship. In 2015, Grant along with Tony Taylor formed the Burlington Futbol Academy. Grant is currently the head coach with Hamilton United Elite with their U17 Ontario Player Development League (OPDL) Girls program.

References

External links

itsportnet.com site for Hamilton and District Soccer Association

Living people
Canada men's international soccer players
Canadian soccer players
English emigrants to Canada
Association football defenders
Footballers from Willesden
Sportspeople from Burlington, Ontario
Soccer players from Hamilton, Ontario
Olympic soccer players of Canada
Footballers at the 1976 Summer Olympics
Naturalized citizens of Canada
Hamilton Croatia players
Canadian National Soccer League players
English expatriate sportspeople in Canada
Expatriate soccer players in Canada
English expatriate footballers
Canadian National Soccer League coaches
English football managers
Canadian soccer coaches
Hamilton Steelers (1981–1992) players
1952 births
Footballers at the 1975 Pan American Games
Pan American Games competitors for Canada
Toronto Nationals (soccer) players
Canadian Professional Soccer League (original) players